The gray slender opossum (Marmosops incanus), is an opossum species from Brazil.

This species is a semi-arboreal marsupial, moving on average 67.38% on the ground. They are solitary, nocturnal, and scansorial (tree climbers). They live off a diet of mainly insects.

References

Opossums
Marsupials of South America
Mammals of Brazil
Endemic fauna of Brazil
Mammals described in 1841